Ish may refer to the following people:
Given name or nickname
Ish Kabibble (1908–1994), American comedian and cornet player
Ish Ledesma (born 1952), American singer, songwriter, musician, and producer
Ishan Morris, Canadian singer and actor, better known as iSH or Ish
Ish Smith (born 1988), American NBA basketball player 
Ish Sodhi (born 1992), New Zealand cricketer 

Surname
Ish-Shalom, multiple people
David Ish-Horowicz (born 1948), British scientist
Kathryn Ish (1936–2007), American theater, film, television and voiceover actress
Nachum Ish Gamzu, 1st century rabbi 
Sulamith Ish-kishor (1896–1977), American writer
Yoram Ish-Hurwitz (born 1968), Dutch pianist